Martin Wachs (1941–2021) was an American professor emeritus of Urban Planning at the University of California, Los Angeles and of City and Regional Planning and of Civil and Environmental Engineering at the University of California, Berkeley. He began his career in university teaching in 1968 and retired from teaching in 2006, to work at the Rand Corporation until 2010.

Early years
Martin Wachs was born June 8, 1941. He attended City College, City University of New York, receiving his bachelor's degree in 1963. He received his masters degree (1965) and his PhD in civil engineering from Northwestern University in 1967.

Career
He taught at University of Illinois at Chicago as assistant professor of systems engineering, then as assistant professor of civil engineering at Northwestern University before heading west to California. He was an associate professor in a newly founded Graduate School of Architecture and Urban Planning at University of California, Los Angeles in 1971, the start of a long career in the University of California system. Besides teaching in Los Angeles, he spent 10 years at UC Berkeley, with the Institute of Transportation Studies.

He was one of the earliest scholars to address transportation's relationship to social equity, environmental quality, and community values.

He wrote 180 articles and four books on subjects related to transportation and land use.
Wachs was awarded the Guggenheim Fellowship for his exceptional scholarship in Architecture, Planning and Design and the Carey Award for service to the Transportation Research Board.

He retired from teaching in 2006, to work at the Rand Corporation until 2010.

In recognition of his extraordinary service, Wachs was honored by the American Institute of Certified Planners and the National Academy of Sciences.

Death
Martin Wachs died at his home in Los Angeles on April 12, 2021, in the midst of collaborating on papers with colleagues.

Books
 Transportation for the Elderly: Changing Lifestyles-Changing Needs. Berkeley: University of California Press, 1979.
 Ethics in Planning. New Brunswick: Center for Urban Policy Research, Rutgers University, 1985.
 The Car and the City: The Automobile, the Built Environment, and Daily Urban Life, University of Michigan Press, 1992.
 Transportation Planning on Trial: The Clean Air Act and Travel Forecasting. Sage Publications, 1996.

References

UCLA Henry Samueli School of Engineering and Applied Science faculty
2021 deaths
Transport engineers
1941 births